Sanrobertia is a genus of flowering plants within the subtribe Symphyotrichinae of the family Asteraceae. It is monotypic, meaning there is only one species within the genus. Sanrobertia gypsophila is a rare endemic known only from Nuevo León, Mexico.

Description
Sanrobertia gypsophila is a perennial, herbaceous plant that blooms with lilac rays and yellow disk centers during the months of August through October. The plant has either tiny glands on tiny stalks called stipitate glands or it may have glands without stalks. These glands are on its upper stems, leaves, and phyllaries. Most of the plant may be slightly strigose with very short, appressed, white, and pointed hairs.

Leaves
Numerous alternate and simple blue-green leaves grow on the stems and branches, and they are usually somewhat clasping at their bases. Their margins (edges) are smooth, shapes are mostly oblong-lanceolate, and tips are curved slighty outward and covered with a few tiny spines.

Flowers
These surround a disk of yellow florets.

Chromosomes
S. gypsophila has a monoploid number (also called base number) of nine chromosomes  The species is diploid with a total chromosome count of 18.

Taxonomy

The basionym of Sanrobertia gypsophila is Aster gypsophilus , first published in 1974. In 1994, Guy L. Nesom reclassified it as Symphyotrichum gypsophilum , even though the chromosome count varied from those species; he wrote that it appeared closely related to the virguloid species in the Symphyotrichum genus. In 2012, the results of further molecular analyses of Symphyotrichum and related species were published by David R. Morgan and Blake Holland which clearly placed it as separate from the Symphyotrichum genus. Thus, in 2018, Nesom published it in a monotypic genus within the subtribe Symphyotrichinae of the tribe Astereae. The cladogram shows that the genera Canadanthus, Ampelaster, and Sanrobertia are the earliest diverging members
of Symphyotrichinae, developing their morphologies prior to the related species in Symphyotrichum, Almutaster, and Psilactis.

Distribution and habitat

Notes

Citations

References 

 
Monotypic Asteraceae genera
Taxa named by Guy L. Nesom